Richard Bullen Newton, ISO, (23 February 1854 - 23 January 1926) was a British paleontologist who was between 1910 and 1912 president of the Malacological Society of London and the Conchological Society of Great Britain & Ireland.

Newton is buried at City of Westminster Cemetery, Hanwell.

The World Register of Marine Species (WoRMS) lists 24 marine genera and species named by him.

Among his many publications:
 Newton, R Bullen, On the necessity for the abandonment of the generic name Cyclostoma, with suggestions regarding others involved in this genus; Annals And Magazine of Natural History 7 (6), 1891
 Newton R. B. (1891). Systematic list of the F. E. Edwards collection of British Oligocene and Eocene mollusca in the British Museum (Natural History), with references to the type-specimens from similar horizons contained in other collections belonging to the Geological Department of the Museum. London, British Museum, XXVIII + 365 pp
 Newton, R Bullen - Holland, Richard, On some Tertiary Foraminifera from Borneo collected by Professor Molengraaff and the late Mr. A. H. Everett, and their comparison with similar forms from Sumatra; Annals And Magazine of Natural History 3 (7), 1899
 Newton, R Bullen, Eocene Shells from Nigeria; Annals And Magazine of Natural History 15 (7), 1905
 Newton, R Bullen - Crick, G C: On some Jurassic Mollusca from Arabia, Annals And Magazine of Natural History 2 (8), 1908
 Newton, R Bullen, On some freshwater fossils from Central South Africa; Annals And Magazine of Natural History 5 (9), 1920
 Newton, R Bullen, On a marine Jurassic fauna from Central Arabia; Annals And Magazine of Natural History 7 (9), 1921

References 

 B. B. Woodward, 1926. Richard Bullen Newton, I.S.O., F.G.S., etc., 1854-1925 [sic.]. Proceedings of the Malacological Society of London 17(2-3): 69-70
 B. B. Woodward, 1926. Richard Bullen Newton, I.S.O. Quarterly Journal of the Geological Society of London 82(3): xlix-l.
 J. R. le B. Tomlin, 1926. Obituary notice: R. B. Newton. Journal of Conchology 18(1): 11-12

1854 births
1926 deaths
British palaeontologists
Fellows of the Geological Society of London
Companions of the Imperial Service Order